Gipton and Harehills is an electoral ward of Leeds City Council in east Leeds, West Yorkshire, covering the inner-city area of Harehills and residential suburb of Gipton.

Councillors 

 indicates seat up for re-election.
* indicates incumbent councillor.

Elections since 2010

May 2022

May 2021

May 2019

May 2018

May 2016

May 2015

May 2014

May 2012

May 2011

May 2010

See also
Listed buildings in Leeds (Gipton and Harehills Ward)

Notes

References

Wards of Leeds